Una (minor planet designation: 160 Una) is a fairly large and dark, primitive Main belt asteroid that was discovered by German-American astronomer C. H. F. Peters on February 20, 1876, in Clinton, New York. It is named after a character in Edmund Spenser's epic poem The Faerie Queene (1590).

In the Tholen classification system it is categorized as a CX-type, while the Bus asteroid taxonomy system lists it as an Xk asteroid. Photometric observations of this asteroid made at the Torino Observatory in Italy during 1990–1991 were used to determine a synodic rotation period of 5.61 ± 0.01 hours.

References

External links 
 2011-Jan-24 Occultation / (2011 Asteroidal Occultation Results for North America)
 
 

000160
Discoveries by Christian Peters
Named minor planets
000160
000160
18760220